John Hallam (1941-2006) was a British character actor.

John Hallam may also refer to:
 John Hallam (died 1537), English rebel against King Henry VIII
 John Hallam (died 1900), Canadian merchant and alderman
 John Hallam (priest) (1728-1811), canon of Windsor